Moulins-Engilbert is a commune in the Nièvre department in central France. It is 10 km north of Saint-Honoré-les-Bains.

The village is home to the museum for the history and breeding of Charolais cattle.

Demographics
On 1 January 2019, the estimated population was 1,445.

See also
Communes of the Nièvre department
Parc naturel régional du Morvan

References

Communes of Nièvre
Nivernais